Calliostoma keenae is a species of sea snail, a marine gastropod mollusk in the family Calliostomatidae.

Distribution
This species occurs in the Pacific Ocean off California, USA.

References

External links
 To Barcode of Life (1 barcode)
 To Biodiversity Heritage Library (2 publications)
 To ITIS
 To World Register of Marine Species

keenae
Gastropods described in 1970